The Movieland Wax Museum, was the largest wax museum in the United States with over 300 wax figures in 150 sets. Located in Buena Park, California, it was for decades one of the most popular wax museums in the United States. It was located north of Knott's Berry Farm on Beach Boulevard.

History
Allen H. Parkinson founded the museum on May 4, 1962, after he was inspired by a visit to the Madame Tussaud's wax museum in London. The opening ceremony was attended by silent film actress Mary Pickford, who dedicated the museum. The project cost $1,500,000. Parkinson sold the museum to the Six Flags Corporation in 1970.

One of the earliest sculptors commissioned by Allen Parkinson to produce these real-sized hyper-realist wax figures in 1960 was the Spanish sculptor . He was responsible for the figures of Clark Gable, Leslie Howard, David Niven, Hattie McDaniel, Olivia de Havilland, Natalie Wood, Vivien Leigh, Charlton Heston, Gene Kelly, Robert Stack, as well as the sets Don Quixote and Sancho, Miguel Angel's David, Leonardo da Vinci, and a full-bodied Gioconda.

In 1975, Six Flags opened a Movieland Wax Museum clone called "Stars Hall of Fame" in Orlando, Florida, located near the intersection of the State Road 528 Bee-Line Expressway and Interstate 4, close to SeaWorld Orlando and just north of Walt Disney World. However, in 1984 after a drop in attendance, the Florida museum was closed and sold to the publisher Harcourt Brace Jovanovich. Having no interest in the museum but an interest in the land alone, Harcourt sold off the exhibits to the American Musical Academy of Arts Association and turned the property into a showroom for the company's educational materials.

In April 1985, the Six Flags Corporation sold the California-based Movieland Wax Museum to Fong & Paul Associates, the owners of the world famous Wax Museum at Fisherman's Wharf in San Francisco.

In the museum's heyday, several actors and actresses attended the unveilings of their wax likenesses, and even went so far as to donate costumes to be worn by their likenesses, along with sets replicated from well-known movie scenes. Movie themes and sound effects also added to the authenticity of the museum. A movie clapperboard on each set included the name of the wax figures and facts about the movie, props, costume, and the person whom the wax figure was modeled on.

The museum was featured in a 1990 episode of the long-running PBS children's television series, Reading Rainbow, where the program's host, LeVar Burton, checked out his wax likeness displayed there.

On August 19, 2002, the museum's founder, Allen Parkinson, died from natural causes at 83 years old in his Rhode Island home.

On October 31, 2005, after forty-three years in business and 10 million visitors, Movieland went out of business. The reason for its closure was because of declining visitors and revenue.

Many of the wax figures and sets from the Movieland Wax Museum were auctioned off in March 2006.

The Movieland Wax Museum property was purchased by the City of Buena Park in May 2007. In 2013 the city leased the property to Premier Exhibitions for display of RMS Titanic relics and its Bodies: The Exhibition.

In March 2015, it was announced that the city of Buena Park had approved plans to convert the Movieland property into a Butterfly Palladium that would "feature the sanctuary for butterflies, hummingbirds, bees and other wildlife, an aquarium with jellyfish, a 3D movie theater, a cafe and a retail shop."

In October 2016, the main Movieland Wax Museum building was torn down to make way for retail space. On July 31, 2018, the tall tower sign that was the tallest sign in Orange County, California was removed.

The former Starlite Gift Shop in front of the museum is now a Starbucks Coffee.

As of 2019, the construction on the retail space has been stalled by a legal battle in which the City of Buena Park had filed a lawsuit to it client, Butterfly Pavillion LLC.

Figures displayed

The Starprint Gallery
The Starprint Gallery was located at the outside of the Movieland Wax Museum, and it featured handprints and footprints of celebrities in cement, dating from the early 1980s. It had a similar concept to the cement handprints at the front of Grauman's Chinese Theater in nearby Hollywood. When the museum closed, the prints still existed until the museum's demolition in 2016.
The celebrities featured on the gallery include:

References

Defunct museums in California
Museums in Orange County, California
Wax museums in California
Buena Park, California
Demolished buildings and structures in California
1962 establishments in California
2005 disestablishments in California
Museums established in 1962
Museums disestablished in 2005
Buildings and structures demolished in 2016